Behar, BeHar, Be-har, or B'har ( — Hebrew for "on the mount," the fifth word, and the first distinctive word, in the parashah) is the 32nd weekly Torah portion (parashah) in the annual Jewish cycle of Torah reading and the ninth in the Book of Leviticus. The parashah tells the laws of the Sabbatical year (Shmita) and limits on debt servitude. The parashah constitutes . It is the shortest of the weekly Torah portions in the Book of Leviticus (although not the shortest in the Torah). It is made up of 2,817 Hebrew letters, 737 Hebrew words, 57 verses, and 99 lines in a Torah Scroll (Sefer Torah).

Jews generally read it in May. The lunisolar Hebrew calendar contains up to 55 weeks, the exact number varying between 50 in common years and 54 or 55 in leap years. In leap years (for example, 2022, 2024, and 2027), parashah Behar is read separately. In common years (for example, 2020, 2021, 2023, 2025, and 2026), parashah Behar is combined with the next parashah, Bechukotai, to help achieve the needed number of weekly readings.

In years when the first day of Passover falls on a Sabbath (as it does in 2022), Jews in Israel and Reform Jews read the parashah following Passover one week before Conservative and Orthodox Jews in the Diaspora. In such years, Jews in Israel and Reform Jews celebrate Passover for seven days and thus read the next parashah (in 2018, Shemini) on the Sabbath one week after the first day of Passover, while Conservative and Orthodox Jews in the Diaspora celebrate Passover for eight days and read the next parashah (in 2018, Shemini) one week later. In some such years (for example, 2018), the two calendars realign when Conservative and Orthodox Jews in the Diaspora read Behar together with Bechukotai while Jews in Israel and Reform Jews read them separately.

Readings

First reading — Leviticus 25:1–13
In the first reading (aliyah), on Mount Sinai, God told Moses to tell the Israelites the law of the Sabbatical year for the land. The people could work the fields for six years, but in the seventh year, the land was to have a Sabbath of complete rest during which the people were not to sow their fields, prune their vineyards, or reap the aftergrowth. They could, however, eat whatever the land produced on its own. The people were further to hallow the 50th year, the Jubilee year, and to proclaim release for all with a blast on the horn. Each Israelite was to return to his family and his ancestral land holding.

Second reading — Leviticus 25:14–18
In the second reading (aliyah), in selling or buying property, the people were to charge only for the remaining number of crop years until the jubilee, when the land would be returned to its ancestral holder.

Third reading — Leviticus 25:19–24
In the third reading (aliyah), God promised to bless the people in the sixth year, so that the land would yield a crop sufficient for three years. God prohibited selling the land beyond reclaim, for God owned the land, and the people were but strangers living with God.

Fourth reading — Leviticus 25:25–28
In the fourth reading (aliyah), if one fell into straits and had to sell land, his nearest relative was to redeem what was sold. If one had no one to redeem, but prospered and acquired enough wealth, he could refund the pro rata share of the sales price for the remaining years until the jubilee, and return to his holding.

Fifth reading — Leviticus 25:29–38
In the fifth reading (aliyah), if one sold a house in a walled city, one could redeem it for a year, and thereafter the house would pass to the purchaser beyond reclaim and not be released in the jubilee. But houses in villages without encircling walls were treated as open country subject to redemption and release through the jubilee. Levites were to have a permanent right of redemption for houses and property in the cities of the Levites. The unenclosed land about their cities could not be sold. If a kinsman fell into straits and came under one's authority by virtue of his debts, one was to let him live by one's side as a kinsman and not exact from him interest. Israelites were not to lend money to countrymen at interest.

Sixth reading — Leviticus 25:39–46
In the sixth reading (aliyah), if the kinsman continued in straits and had to give himself over to a creditor for debt, the creditor was not to subject him to the treatment of a slave, but to treat him as a hired or bound laborer until the jubilee year, at which time he was to be freed to go back to his family and ancestral holding. Israelites were not to rule over such debtor Israelites ruthlessly. Israelites could, however, buy and own as inheritable property slaves from other nations.

Seventh reading — Leviticus 25:47–26:2
In the seventh reading (aliyah), if an Israelite fell into straits and came under a resident alien's authority by virtue of his debts, the Israelite debtor was to have the right of redemption. A relative was to redeem him or, if he prospered, he could redeem himself by paying the pro rata share of the sales price for the remaining years until the jubilee.

Readings according to the triennial cycle
Jews who read the Torah according to the triennial cycle of Torah reading read the parashah according to a different schedule.

In inner-biblical interpretation
The parashah has parallels or is discussed in these Biblical sources:

Leviticus chapter 25

Yom Kippur
 refers to the Festival of Yom Kippur. In the Hebrew Bible, Yom Kippur is called:
the Day of Atonement (Yom HaKippurim) or a Day of Atonement (Yom Kippurim);
a Sabbath of solemn rest (Shabbat Shabbaton); and
a holy convocation (mikrah kodesh).

Much as Yom Kippur, on the 10th of the month of Tishrei, precedes the Festival of Sukkot, on the 15th of the month of Tishrei,  speaks of a period starting on the 10th of the month of Nisan preparatory to the Festival of Passover, on the 15th of the month of Nisan.

Similarly,  and  call it a "Sabbath of solemn rest." And  and  institute the observance as "a statute forever."

 sets out detailed procedures for the priest's atonement ritual during the time of the Temple.

 instructs that after seven Sabbatical years, on the Jubilee year, on the day of atonement, the Israelites were to proclaim liberty throughout the land with the blast of the horn and return all people to their possessions and to their families.

In , the Haftarah for Yom Kippur morning, God describes "the fast that I have chosen [on] the day for a man to afflict his soul."  makes clear that "to afflict the soul" was understood as fasting.

The Duty To Redeem

Naboth

Leviticus chapter 26
 directs the Israelites not to rear up a pillar (matzeivah).  directed the Israelites to break in pieces the Canaanites' pillars (matzeivoteihem). And  prohibits setting up a pillar (matzeivah), "which the Lord your God hates."

In early nonrabbinic interpretation
The parashah has parallels or is discussed in these early nonrabbinic sources:

Leviticus chapter 25
The Damascus Document of the Qumran sectarians prohibited non-cash transactions with Jews who were not members of the sect. Apparently, the Qumran sect viewed prevailing methods of conducting business through credit to violate those laws.

In classical rabbinic interpretation
The parashah is discussed in these rabbinic sources from the era of the Mishnah and the Talmud:

Leviticus chapter 25

Leviticus 25:1–34 — a Sabbatical year for the land

The Mishnah asked until when a field with trees could be plowed in the sixth year. The House of Shammai said as long as such work would benefit fruit that would ripen in the sixth year. But the House of Hillel said until Shavuot. The Mishnah observed that in reality, the views of two schools approximate each other. The Mishnah taught that one could plow a grain-field in the sixth year until the moisture had dried up in the soil (that it, after Passover, when rains in the Land of Israel cease) or as long as people still plowed in order to plant cucumbers and gourds (which need a great deal of moisture). Rabbi Simeon objected that if that were the rule, then we would place the law in the hands of each person to decide. But the Mishnah concluded that the prescribed period in the case of a grain-field was until Passover, and in the case of a field with trees, until Shavuot. But Rabban Gamaliel and his court ordained that working the land was permitted until the New Year that began the seventh year. Thus, just as in the case of the Sabbath Day, work is forbidden on the day itself, but allowed on the day before and the day after, so likewise in the Sabbath Year, tillage is forbidden during the year itself, but allowed in the year before and the year after.

The Mishnah taught that we encourage the work of non-Jews in the Sabbatical year, but not that of Jews. And we inquire after the non-Jews’ wellbeing for the sake of peace.

Rabbi Isaac taught that the words of Psalm , "mighty in strength that fulfill His word," speak of those who observe the Sabbatical year. Rabbi Isaac said that we often find that a person fulfills a precept for a day, a week, or a month, but it is remarkable to find one who does so for an entire year. Rabbi Isaac asked whether one could find a mightier person than one who sees one's field untilled, see one's vineyard untilled, and yet pays one's taxes and does not complain. And Rabbi Isaac noted that  uses the words "that fulfill His word (devar)," and  says regarding observance of the Sabbatical year, "And this is the manner (devar) of the release," and argued that "dabar" means the observance of the Sabbatical year in both places.

The Mishnah taught that the fines for rape, seduction, the husband who falsely accused his bride of not having been a virgin (as in ), and any judicial court matter are not canceled by the Sabbatical year.

The Mishnah told that when Hillel the Elder observed that the nation withheld from lending to each other and were transgressing , "Beware lest there be in your mind a base thought," he instituted the prozbul, a court exemption from the Sabbatical year cancellation of a loan. The Mishnah taught that any loan made with a prozbul is not canceled by the Sabbatical year. The Mishnah recounted that a prozbul would provide: "I turn over to you, so-and-so, judges of such and such a place, that any debt that I may have outstanding, I shall collect it whenever I desire." And the judges or witnesses would sign below.

One could (1) plow with an ox and a donkey yoked together (in violation of ) (2 and 3) that are two animals dedicated to the sanctuary, (4) plowing mixed seeds sown in a vineyard (in violation of ), (5) during a Sabbatical year (in violation of ), (6) on a Festival-day (in violation of, for example), (7) when the plower is a priest (in violation of ) and (8) a Nazirite (in violation of ) plowing in a contaminated place. They said to him that this would not be in the same category as the other violations. He replied that neither is the Nazirite in the same category as the other violations.

The Gemara implied that the sin of Moses in striking the rock at Meribah compared favorably to the sin of David. The Gemara reported that Moses and David were two good leaders of Israel. David, however, begged that his sin be blotted out, as  says, "Happy is he whose transgression is forgiven, whose sin is pardoned." The Gemara compared the cases of Moses and David to the cases of two women whom the court sentenced to be lashed. The woman who had eaten unripe figs begged the court to make known for what offense she was being flogged, lest people say that she was being punished for the same sin as the other woman. The court thus made known her sin, and the Torah repeatedly records the sin of Moses.

The Mishnah taught that the jubilee year had the same ritual as Rosh Hashanah for blowing the shofar and for blessings. But Rabbi Judah said that on Rosh Hashanah, the blast was made with a ram's horn shofar, while on jubilee the blast was made with an antelope's (or some say a goat's) horn shofar.

And pestilence resulted from (among other things) violation of the laws governing the produce of the Sabbatical year.

The Mishnah defined as fraud overcharging by one-sixth of the purchase price. And the Mishnah taught that a person defrauded had until that person had time to show the purchase to a merchant or a kinsman to retract the sale. The Mishnah taught that the law of fraud applied to both the buyer and the seller, both the ordinary person and the merchant. Rabbi Judah said that the law of fraud did not apply to the merchant. The Mishnah taught that the one who was defrauded had the upper hand: The person defrauded could demand from the other the money paid or the amount by which that person was defrauded. The Mishnah taught that one who stole something worth even a perutah (the minimum amount of significant value) from a fellow and swore falsely about it had to go after the victim even as far as Media to return it. The Mishnah taught that just as the laws of fraud applied to buying and selling, so too did they apply to the spoken word. The Mishnah taught that one could not ask how much an object costs if one did not wish to buy it.

At a feast, Rabbi served his disciples tender and tough cuts of beef tongue. When his disciples chose the tender over the tough, Rabbi instructed them so to let their tongues be tender to one another. Rabbi taught that this was the meaning of  when Moses admonished: "And if you sell anything . . . you shall not wrong one another." Similarly, a Midrash concluded that these words of  taught that anyone who wrongs a neighbor with words will be punished according to Scripture.

The Gemara said that Scripture uses the words "and you shall fear your God" (as in ) concerning cases where intent matters, cases that are known only to the heart. Rabbi Joḥanan said on the authority of Rabbi Simeon ben Yoḥai that verbal wrongs are more heinous than monetary wrongs, because of verbal wrongs it is written (in ), "and you shall fear your God," but not of monetary wrongs (in ). Rabbi Eleazar said that verbal wrongs affect the victim's person, while monetary wrongs affect only the victim's money. Rabbi Samuel bar Naḥmani said that while restoration is possible in cases of monetary wrongs, it is not in cases of verbal wrongs. And a Tanna taught before Rav Naḥman bar Isaac that one who publicly makes a neighbor blanch from shame is as one who sheds blood. Whereupon Rav Naḥman remarked how he had seen the blood rush from a person's face upon such shaming.

" Thus one must not mistreat one who is with one in observance of Torah and commandments.

Reading , "And you shall not mistreat a convert nor oppress him, because you were strangers in the land of Egypt," a Baraita reported that Rabbi Nathan taught that one should not mention in another a defect that one has oneself. Thus, since the Jewish people were themselves strangers, they should not demean a convert because he is a stranger in their midst. And this explains the adage that one who has a person hanged in the family does not say to another member of the household: Hang a fish for me, as the mention of hanging is demeaning for that family.

Rabbi Phinehas taught that God will reward with life anyone who gives a coin to a poor person, for the donor could be giving not just a coin, but life. Rabbi Phinehas explained that if a loaf costs ten coins, and a poor person has but nine, then the gift of a single coin allows the poor person to buy the loaf, eat, and become refreshed. Thus, Rabbi Phinehas taught, when illness strikes the donor, and the donor's soul presses to leave the donor's body, God will return the gift of life. Similarly, Rav Naḥman taught that  exhorts Israel to acts of charity, because fortune revolves like a wheel in the world, sometimes leaving one poor and sometimes well off. And similarly, Rabbi Tanḥum son of Rabbi Ḥiyya taught that  exhorts Israel to acts of charity, because God made the poor as well as the rich, so that they might benefit each other; the rich one benefiting the poor one with charity, and the poor one benefiting the rich one by affording the rich one the opportunity to do good. Bearing this in mind, when Rabbi Tanhum's mother went to buy him a pound of meat, she would buy him two pounds, one for him and one for the poor.

The Gemara reasoned that if , yamim, in  means "days" and thus to imply "two days" (as the plural implies more than one), then  would report Rebekah's brother and mother suggesting that she stay first two days, and then when Eliezer said that that was too long, nonsensically suggesting ten days. Thus  might mean, "Let the maiden abide with us a year, or at the least ten months." The Gemara then suggested that , yamim, might mean "a month," as  suggests when it uses the phrase "a month of days (yamim)." The Gemara concluded, however, that , yamim, means "a month" only when the term "month" is specifically mentioned, but otherwise means either "days" (at least two) or "a year."

Leviticus 25:35–55 — limits on debt servitude
The Sifra compared financial strains to a load on a donkey. While the donkey is still standing in place, a single person can take hold of it and lead it. But if the donkey falls to the ground, five people cannot pick it up again.

A Midrash played on this meaning, teaching not to take interest from the poor person, not to bite the poor person as the serpent — cunning to do evil — bit Adam. The Midrash taught that one who exacts interest from an Israelite thus has no fear of God.

A Baraita considered the case where two people were traveling on a journey, and one had a container of water; if both drank, they would both die, but if only one drank, then that one might reach civilization and survive. Ben Patura taught that it is better that both should drink and die, rather than that only one should drink and see the other die.

The Rabbis taught in a Baraita that the words of  regarding the Hebrew servant, "he fares well with you," indicate that the Hebrew servant had to be "with" — that is, equal to — the master in food and drink. Thus, the master could not eat white bread and have the servant eat black bread. The master could not drink old wine and have the servant drink new wine. The master could not sleep on a feather bed and have the servant sleep on straw. Hence, they said that buying a Hebrew servant was like buying a master.

The Sifra read , “For they are My servants,” to imply that God's deed of servitude came first, and therefore, Israelites may serve others only as God permits. And the Sifra read , "whom I took out of the land of Egypt" to imply that God took the Israelites out on the condition that they not be sold as slaves are sold.

Rabbi Joḥanan read , “They shall not be sold as bondsmen,” to prohibit abduction. Rabbi Josiah said that  (Exodus 20:13 in the NJPS), “You shalt not steal,” did so. Rabbi Joḥanan said that , “They shall not be sold as bondsmen,” did so. The Gemara harmonized the two teachings by interpreting Rabbi Josiah to state the prohibition for stealing (including abduction) and Rabbi Joḥanan to state the prohibition for selling the kidnapped person.

Rabbi Levi interpreted  to teach that God claimed Israel as God's own possession when God said, "To Me the children of Israel are servants."

And Rabbi Simeon bar Rabbi explained that God singled out the doorpost from all other parts of the house because the doorpost was witness in Egypt when God passed over the lintel and the doorposts (as reported in ) and proclaimed (in the words of ), "For to me the children of Israel are servants, they are my servants," and not servants of servants, and so God brought them forth from bondage to freedom, yet this servant acquired a master for himself.

In modern interpretation
The parashah is discussed in these modern sources:

Leviticus chapter 25

Professor William Dever of Lycoming College noted that  recognizes three land-use distinctions: (1) walled cities (ir chomot); (2) unwalled villages (chazeirim, specially said to be unwalled); and (3) land surrounding such a city (sedeih migrash) and the countryside (sedeih ha-aretz, "fields of the land").

Commandments
According to Sefer ha-Chinuch, there are 7 positive and 17 negative commandments in the parashah:
Not to work the land during the seventh year
Not to work with trees to produce fruit during that year
Not to reap crops that grow wild that year in the normal manner
Not to gather grapes which grow wild that year in the normal way
The Sanhedrin must count seven groups of seven years.
To blow the shofar on the tenth of Tishrei to free the slaves
The Sanhedrin must sanctify the 50th year.
Not to work the soil during the 50th year
Not to reap in the normal manner that which grows wild in the fiftieth year
Not to pick grapes which grew wild in the normal manner in the fiftieth year
To buy and sell according to Torah law
Not to overcharge or underpay for an article
Not to insult or harm anybody with words
Not to sell the land in Israel indefinitely
To carry out the laws of sold family properties
To carry out the laws of houses in walled cities
Not to sell the fields but they shall remain the Levites' before and after the Jubilee year

Not to lend with interest
Not to have a Hebrew servant do menial slave labor
Not to sell a Hebrew servant as a slave is sold
Not to work a Hebrew servant oppressively
Canaanite slaves must be kept forever
Not to allow a non-Jew to work a Hebrew servant oppressively
Not to bow down on smooth stone

Haftarah

When parashah Behar is combined with parashah Behukotai, the haftarah is the haftarah for Behukotai, .

Notes

Further reading
The parashah has parallels or is discussed in these sources:

Ancient

Code of Hammurabi § 117. Babylonia, Circa 1780 BCE. In e.g. Ancient Near Eastern Texts Relating to the Old Testament. Edited by James B. Pritchard, pages 163, 170–71. Princeton: Princeton University Press, 1969. . (3-year limit on debt servitude for wife or child).
Julius Lewy. "The Biblical Institution of deror in the Light of Akkadian Documents." Eretz-Israel, volume 5 (1958): pages 21–31.

Biblical
 (slavery);  (Sabbatical year)
 (Sabbatical year).
 (Sabbatical year);  (Sabbatical year);  (Sabbatical year).
2 Kings  (slavery).
 (proclaim release).
 (next of kin redeemer);  (releasing Hebrew slaves).
, 19 (economic equalization);  (year of release).
 (slavery).
 (dwell in safety);  (lending);  (lending);  (God chastens man for iniquity);  (sojourner on earth).
 (slavery).
2 Chronicles  (Sabbatical year).

Early nonrabbinic

Jubilees chs. 1–50 Land of Israel, 2nd Century BCE.
Quran 2:275; 3:130. Arabia, 7th century. (Islam's parallel prohibition of interest, or riba).

Classical rabbinic
Mishnah: Sheviit 1:1–10:9; Rosh Hashanah 3:5; Ketubot 9:9; Nedarim 9:4; Kiddushin 1:2–3; Bava Metzia 5:1–11; Sanhedrin 3:4; Makkot 3:9; Avot 5:8–9; Bekhorot 9:10; Arakhin 7:1–9:8. Land of Israel, circa 200 CE. In, e.g., The Mishnah: A New Translation. Translated by Jacob Neusner, pages 68–93, 304, 424, 487, 544, 588, 618, 687, 807, 821–24. New Haven: Yale University Press, 1988. .
Tosefta: Sheviit 1:1–8:11; Maaser Sheni 2:15; Sotah 5:11; Kiddushin 1:5–6; Bava Kamma 7:5; Bava Metzia 3:25; 4:2; Avodah Zarah 4:5; Arakhin 4:9; 5:1–19. Land of Israel, circa 250 CE. In, e.g., The Tosefta: Translated from the Hebrew, with a New Introduction. Translated by Jacob Neusner, volume 1, pages 203–49, 307, 853, 926–27; volume 2, pages 987, 1042, 1044, 1275, 1507, 1512–17. Peabody, Massachusetts: Hendrickson Publishers, 2002. .
Sifra Behar (245:1–259:2). Land of Israel, 4th Century CE. In, e.g., Sifra: An Analytical Translation. Translated by Jacob Neusner, volume 3, pages 291–344. Atlanta: Scholars Press, 1988. .
Jerusalem Talmud: Peah 67a; Demai 24a, 48b; Sheviit 1a–87b; Maasrot 31b, 42b; Orlah 8a; Shabbat 56a–57a; Pesachim 34a; Rosh Hashanah 7b, 15b, 20b, 22b; Megillah 2b; Ketubot 24b, 25b; Nedarim 32a; Gittin 20a, 23b–24a; Kiddushin 1b, 6a, 7a–b, 10b–11b; Bava Metzia 14a, 17a, 23a, 24a; Sanhedrin 4b, 40a, 41a–b. Tiberias, Land of Israel, circa 400 CE. In, e.g., Talmud Yerushalmi. Edited by Chaim Malinowitz, Yisroel Simcha Schorr, and Mordechai Marcus, volumes 3–4, 6a–b, 9, 12, 14, 18, 24, 26, 31, 33, 38, 40, 42, 44–45. Brooklyn: Mesorah Publications, 2006–2018. And reprinted in, e.g., The Jerusalem Talmud: A Translation and Commentary. Edited by Jacob Neusner and translated by Jacob Neusner, Tzvee Zahavy, B. Barry Levy, and Edward Goldman. Peabody, Massachusetts: Hendrickson Publishers, 2009. .
Mekhilta According to Rabbi Ishmael 1:2. Land of Israel, late 4th Century. In, e.g., Mekhilta According to Rabbi Ishmael. Translated by Jacob Neusner, volume 1, page 6. Atlanta: Scholars Press, 1988. .
Leviticus Rabbah 1:1; 2:2; 7:6; 29:11; 33:1–34:16. Land of Israel, 5th Century. In, e.g., Midrash Rabbah: Leviticus. Translated by Harry Freedman and Maurice Simon, volume 4, pages 2, 21, 98, 378, 418–45. London: Soncino Press, 1939. . 
Babylonian Talmud: Berakhot 12b, 36b, 47b; Shabbat 33a, 96b, 131b; Pesachim 51b, 52b; Yoma 65b, 86b; Sukkah 3a, 39a, 40a–b; Beitzah 34b, 37b; Rosh Hashanah 2a, 6b, 8b–9b, 13a, 24a, 26a, 27b, 30a, 33b–34a; Taanit 6b, 19b; Megillah 3b, 5b, 10b, 22b, 23b; Moed Katan 2a–4a, 13a; Chagigah 3b; Yevamot 46a, 47a, 78b, 83a; Ketubot 43a–b, 57b, 84a, 110b; Nedarim 42a, 58b, 61a; Nazir 5a, 61b; Sotah 3b; Gittin 25a, 36a–39a, 44b, 47a, 48b, 65a, 74b; Kiddushin 2b, 8a, 9a, 14b–17b, 20a–22b, 26a, 33b, 38b, 40b, 53a, 58a, 67b; Bava Kamma 28a, 62b, 69a–b, 82b, 87a, 101a–02a, 103a, 112a, 113a–b, 116b, 117b; Bava Metzia 10a, 12a, 30b, 47b, 51a, 56b, 57b, 58b–59b, 60b–61b, 65a, 71a, 73b, 75b, 79a, 82a, 88b, 106a, 109a, 114a; Bava Batra 10a, 80b, 91b, 102b, 110b, 112a, 137a, 139a; Sanhedrin 10b, 12a, 15a, 24b, 26a, 39a, 65b, 86a, 101b, 106b; Makkot 3b, 8a–b, 11b–12a, 13a, 21b; Shevuot 4b, 16a, 45a; Avodah Zarah 9b, 20a, 50b, 54b, 62a; Menachot 84a; Chullin 6a, 114b, 120b; Bekhorot 12b–13b, 51a, 52b; Arakhin 14b, 15b, 18b, 24a–34a; Temurah 6b, 27a; Niddah 8b, 47a–48a, 51b. Sasanian Empire, 6th Century. In, e.g., Talmud Bavli. Edited by Yisroel Simcha Schorr, Chaim Malinowitz, and Mordechai Marcus, 72 volumes. Brooklyn: Mesorah Pubs., 2006.
Midrash Tanhuma, Behar. 6th–7th Century. In, e.g., Metsudah Midrash Tanchuma: Vayikra. Translated and annotated by Avraham Davis, edited by Yaakov Y.H. Pupko, 5:502–30. Monsey, N.Y.: Eastern Book Press, 2006.

Medieval
Rashi. Commentary. Leviticus 25–26. Troyes, France, late 11th Century. In, e.g., Rashi. The Torah: With Rashi's Commentary Translated, Annotated, and Elucidated. Translated and annotated by Yisrael Isser Zvi Herczeg, volume 3, pages 317–46. Brooklyn: Mesorah Publications, 1994. .
Rashbam. Commentary on the Torah. Troyes, early 12th century. In, e.g., Rashbam's Commentary on Leviticus and Numbers: An Annotated Translation. Edited and translated by Martin I. Lockshin, pages 131–37. Providence: Brown Judaic Studies, 2001. .
Judah Halevi. Kuzari. 2:18. Toledo, Spain, 1130–1140. In, e.g., Jehuda Halevi. Kuzari: An Argument for the Faith of Israel. Introduction by Henry Slonimsky, page 93. New York: Schocken, 1964. .
Abraham ibn Ezra. Commentary on the Torah. Mid-12th century. In, e.g., Ibn Ezra's Commentary on the Pentateuch: Leviticus (Va-yikra). Translated and annotated by H. Norman Strickman and Arthur M. Silver, volume 3, pages 239–61. New York: Menorah Publishing Company, 2004. .
Maimonides. Mishneh Torah: Hilchot Shemita V'Yovel (Laws of the Sabbatical and Jubilee Years). Egypt. Circa 1170–1180. In, e.g., Mishneh Torah: Sefer Zeraim: The Book of Agricultural Ordinances. Translated by Eliyahu Touger, pages 716–837. New York: Moznaim Publishing, 2005. .

Maimonides. The Guide for the Perplexed, part 1, chapter 12; part 3, chapters 38, 45. Cairo, Egypt, 1190. In, e.g., Moses Maimonides. The Guide for the Perplexed. Translated by Michael Friedländer, pages 24, 340, 357. New York: Dover Publications, 1956. .
Hezekiah ben Manoah. Hizkuni. France, circa 1240. In, e.g., Chizkiyahu ben Manoach. Chizkuni: Torah Commentary. Translated and annotated by Eliyahu Munk, volume 3, pages 819–29. Jerusalem: Ktav Publishers, 2013. .
Naḥmanides. Commentary on the Torah. Jerusalem, circa 1270. In, e.g., Ramban (Nachmanides): Commentary on the Torah. Translated by Charles B. Chavel, volume 3, pages 409–54. New York: Shilo Publishing House, 1974. .

Zohar, part 3, pages 107b–111a. Spain, late 13th Century. In, e.g., The Zohar. Translated by Harry Sperling and Maurice Simon. 5 volumes. London: Soncino Press, 1934.
Bahya ben Asher. Commentary on the Torah. Spain, early 14th century. In, e.g., Midrash Rabbeinu Bachya: Torah Commentary by Rabbi Bachya ben Asher. Translated and annotated by Eliyahu Munk, volume 5, pages 1821–45. Jerusalem: Lambda Publishers, 2003. .
Jacob ben Asher (Baal Ha-Turim). Rimze Ba'al ha-Turim. Early 14th century. In, e.g., Baal Haturim Chumash: Vayikra/Leviticus. Translated by Eliyahu Touger, edited, elucidated, and annotated by Avie Gold, volume 3, pages 1271–93. Brooklyn: Mesorah Publications, 2000. .
Jacob ben Asher. Perush Al ha-Torah. Early 14th century. In, e.g., Yaakov ben Asher. Tur on the Torah. Translated and annotated by Eliyahu Munk, volume 3, pages 969–85. Jerusalem: Lambda Publishers, 2005. .
Isaac ben Moses Arama. Akedat Yizhak (The Binding of Isaac). Late 15th century. In, e.g., Yitzchak Arama. Akeydat Yitzchak: Commentary of Rabbi Yitzchak Arama on the Torah. Translated and condensed by Eliyahu Munk, volume 2, pages 669–73. New York, Lambda Publishers, 2001. .

Modern
Isaac Abravanel. Commentary on the Torah. Italy, between 1492 and 1509. In, e.g., Abarbanel: Selected Commentaries on the Torah: Volume 3: Vayikra/Leviticus. Translated and annotated by Israel Lazar, pages 230–52. Brooklyn: CreateSpace, 2015. .
Obadiah ben Jacob Sforno. Commentary on the Torah. Venice, 1567. In, e.g., Sforno: Commentary on the Torah. Translation and explanatory notes by Raphael Pelcovitz, pages 614–25. Brooklyn: Mesorah Publications, 1997. .
Moshe Alshich. Commentary on the Torah. Safed, circa 1593. In, e.g., Moshe Alshich. Midrash of Rabbi Moshe Alshich on the Torah. Translated and annotated by Eliyahu Munk, volume 2, pages 751–71. New York, Lambda Publishers, 2000. .

Thomas Hobbes. Leviathan, 3:40; Review & Conclusion. England, 1651. Reprint edited by C. B. Macpherson, pages 503–04, 723. Harmondsworth, England: Penguin Classics, 1982. .
Shabbethai Bass. Sifsei Chachamim. Amsterdam, 1680. In, e.g., Sefer Vayikro: From the Five Books of the Torah: Chumash: Targum Okelos: Rashi: Sifsei Chachamim: Yalkut: Haftaros, translated by Avrohom Y. Davis, pages 483–529. Lakewood Township, New Jersey: Metsudah Publications, 2012.
Chaim ibn Attar. Ohr ha-Chaim. Venice, 1742. In Chayim ben Attar. Or Hachayim: Commentary on the Torah. Translated by Eliyahu Munk, volume 3, pages 1271–91. Brooklyn: Lambda Publishers, 1999. .

Nachman of Breslov. Teachings. Bratslav, Ukraine, before 1811. In Rebbe Nachman's Torah: Breslov Insights into the Weekly Torah Reading: Exodus-Leviticus. Compiled by Chaim Kramer, edited by Y. Hall, pages 419–25. Jerusalem: Breslov Research Institute, 2011. .
Samuel David Luzzatto (Shadal). Commentary on the Torah. Padua, 1871. In, e.g., Samuel David Luzzatto. Torah Commentary. Translated and annotated by Eliyahu Munk, volume 3, pages 984–93. New York: Lambda Publishers, 2012. .

Yehudah Aryeh Leib Alter. Sefat Emet. Góra Kalwaria (Ger), Poland, before 1906. Excerpted in The Language of Truth: The Torah Commentary of Sefat Emet. Translated and interpreted by Arthur Green, pages 201–07. Philadelphia: Jewish Publication Society, 1998. . Reprinted 2012. .
Hermann Cohen. Religion of Reason: Out of the Sources of Judaism. Translated with an introduction by Simon Kaplan; introductory essays by Leo Strauss, pages 126, 152–53. New York: Ungar, 1972. Reprinted Atlanta: Scholars Press, 1995. . Originally published as Religion der Vernunft aus den Quellen des Judentums. Leipzig: Gustav Fock, 1919.

H. G. Wells. “Serfs, Slaves, Social Classes and Free Individuals.” In The Outline of History: Being a Plain History of Life and Mankind, pages 254–59. New York: The Macmillan Company, 1920. Revised edition Doubleday and Company, 1971. .
Alexander Alan Steinbach. Sabbath Queen: Fifty-four Bible Talks to the Young Based on Each Portion of the Pentateuch, pages 100–03. New York: Behrman's Jewish Book House, 1936.

Thomas Mann. Joseph and His Brothers. Translated by John E. Woods, page 356. New York: Alfred A. Knopf, 2005. . Originally published as Joseph und seine Brüder. Stockholm: Bermann-Fischer Verlag, 1943. (sacred stone).
Isaac Mendelsohn. "Slavery in the Ancient Near East." Biblical Archaeologist, volume 9 (1946): pages 74–88.
Isaac Mendelsohn. Slavery in the Ancient Near East. New York: Oxford University Press, 1949.

Electric Prunes. "Kol Nidre." In Release of an Oath. Reprise Records, 1968. (track based on the Yom Kippur Kol Nidre prayer).
Gordon J. Wenham. The Book of Leviticus, pages 313–29. Grand Rapids, Michigan: William B. Eerdmans Publishing Company, 1979. .
Pinchas H. Peli. Torah Today: A Renewed Encounter with Scripture, pages 147–50. Washington, D.C.: B'nai B'rith Books, 1987. .
Ben Zion Bergman. "A Question of Great Interest: May a Synagogue Issue Interest-Bearing Bonds?" New York: Rabbinical Assembly, 1988. YD 167:1.1988a. In Responsa: 1980–1990: The Committee on Jewish Law and Standards of the Conservative Movement. Edited by David J. Fine, pages 319–23. New York: Rabbinical Assembly, 2005. .
Avram Israel Reisner. "Dissent: A Matter of Great Interest" New York: Rabbinical Assembly, 1988. YD 167:1.1988b. In Responsa: 1980–1990: The Committee on Jewish Law and Standards of the Conservative Movement. Edited by David J. Fine, pages 324–28. New York: Rabbinical Assembly, 2005. .
Elliot N. Dorff. "A Jewish Approach to End-Stage Medical Care." New York: Rabbinical Assembly, 1990. YD 339:1.1990b. In Responsa: 1980–1990: The Committee on Jewish Law and Standards of the Conservative Movement. Edited by David J. Fine, pages 519, 531–32, 564. New York: Rabbinical Assembly, 2005. . (implications of God's ownership of the universe on the duty to maintain life and health).
Harvey J. Fields. A Torah Commentary for Our Times: Volume II: Exodus and Leviticus, pages 150–61. New York: UAHC Press, 1991. .
Jacob Milgrom. "Sweet Land and Liberty: Whether real or utopian, the laws in Leviticus seem to be a more sensitive safeguard against pauperization than we, here and now, have devised." Bible Review, volume 9 (number 4) (August 1993).
Walter C. Kaiser Jr., " The Book of Leviticus," in The New Interpreter's Bible, volume 1, pages 1166–79. Nashville: Abingdon Press, 1994. .
Judith S. Antonelli. "Mother Nature." In In the Image of God: A Feminist Commentary on the Torah, pages 322–28. Northvale, New Jersey: Jason Aronson, 1995. .
Elliot N. Dorff. "Family Violence." New York: Rabbinical Assembly, 1995. HM 424.1995. In Responsa: 1991–2000: The Committee on Jewish Law and Standards of the Conservative Movement. Edited by Kassel Abelson and David J. Fine, pages 773, 792. New York: Rabbinical Assembly, 2002. . (verbal abuse).
Ellen Frankel. The Five Books of Miriam: A Woman's Commentary on the Torah, pages 188–90. New York: G. P. Putnam's Sons, 1996. .

W. Gunther Plaut. The Haftarah Commentary, pages 308–17. New York: UAHC Press, 1996. .
Elliot N. Dorff. "Assisted Suicide." New York: Rabbinical Assembly, 1997. YD 345.1997a. In Responsa: 1991–2000: The Committee on Jewish Law and Standards of the Conservative Movement. Edited by Kassel Abelson and David J. Fine, pages 379, 380. New York: Rabbinical Assembly, 2002. . (implications for assisted suicide of God's ownership of the universe).
Sorel Goldberg Loeb and Barbara Binder Kadden. Teaching Torah: A Treasury of Insights and Activities, pages 214–19. Denver: A.R.E. Publishing, 1997. .
Jacob Milgrom. "Jubilee: A Rallying Cry for Today's Oppressed: The laws of the Jubilee year offer a blueprint for bridging the gap between the have and have-not nations." Bible Review, volume 13 (number 2) (April 1997).
Mary Douglas. Leviticus as Literature, pages 219–20, 242–44. Oxford: Oxford University Press, 1999. .
Susan Freeman. Teaching Jewish Virtues: Sacred Sources and Arts Activities, pages 332–46. Springfield, New Jersey: A.R.E. Publishing, 1999. . (43).
Michael Hudson. "Proclaim Liberty Throughout the Land: The economic roots of the Jubilee." Bible Review, volume 15 (number 1) (February 1999).
Joel Roth. "Organ Donation." New York: Rabbinical Assembly, 1999. YD 336.1999-. In Responsa: 1991–2000: The Committee on Jewish Law and Standards of the Conservative Movement. Edited by Kassel Abelson and David J. Fine, pages 194, 258–59. New York: Rabbinical Assembly, 2002. . (implications for organ donation of one's duty to assist another).
Frank H. Gorman Jr. "Leviticus." In The HarperCollins Bible Commentary. Edited by James L. Mays, pages 163–64. New York: HarperCollins Publishers, revised edition, 2000. .
Sharon Brous and Jill Hammer. "Proclaiming Liberty throughout the Land." In The Women's Torah Commentary: New Insights from Women Rabbis on the 54 Weekly Torah Portions. Edited by Elyse Goldstein, pages 238–45. Woodstock, Vermont: Jewish Lights Publishing, 2000. .
Jacob Milgrom. Leviticus 23–27, volume 3B, pages 2145–271. New York: Anchor Bible, 2000. .
James Rosen. "Mental Retardation, Group Homes and the Rabbi." New York: Rabbinical Assembly, 2000. YD 336:1.2000. In Responsa: 1991–2000: The Committee on Jewish Law and Standards of the Conservative Movement. Edited by Kassel Abelson and David J. Fine, pages 337–46. New York: Rabbinical Assembly, 2002. .
Lainie Blum Cogan and Judy Weiss. Teaching Haftarah: Background, Insights, and Strategies, pages 406–12. Denver: A.R.E. Publishing, 2002. .
Michael Fishbane. The JPS Bible Commentary: Haftarot, pages 197–202. Philadelphia: Jewish Publication Society, 2002. .
Joseph Telushkin. The Ten Commandments of Character: Essential Advice for Living an Honorable, Ethical, Honest Life, pages 290–91. New York: Bell Tower, 2003. .
Robert Alter. The Five Books of Moses: A Translation with Commentary, pages 653–60. New York: W.W. Norton & Co., 2004. .
Jacob Milgrom. Leviticus: A Book of Ritual and Ethics: A Continental Commentary, pages 298–317. Minneapolis: Fortress Press, 2004. .
Baruch J. Schwartz. "Leviticus." In The Jewish Study Bible. Edited by Adele Berlin and Marc Zvi Brettler, pages 269–73. New York: Oxford University Press, 2004. .
Nancy Wechsler-Azen. "Haftarat Behar: Jeremiah 32:6–27." In The Women's Haftarah Commentary: New Insights from Women Rabbis on the 54 Weekly Haftarah Portions, the 5 Megillot & Special Shabbatot. Edited by Elyse Goldstein, pages 146–50. Woodstock, Vermont: Jewish Lights Publishing, 2004. .
Antony Cothey. “Ethics and Holiness in the Theology of Leviticus.” Journal for the Study of the Old Testament, volume 30 (number 2) (December 2005): pages 131–51.
Professors on the Parashah: Studies on the Weekly Torah Reading Edited by Leib Moscovitz, pages 216–24. Jerusalem: Urim Publications, 2005. .
Nathaniel Philbrick. Mayflower: A Story of Courage, Community, and War, page 309. New York: Viking Penguin, 2006. . (Jubilee.)
Bernard J. Bamberger. "Leviticus." In The Torah: A Modern Commentary: Revised Edition. Edited by W. Gunther Plaut; revised edition edited by David E.S. Stern, pages 849–63. New York: Union for Reform Judaism, 2006. .
John S. Bergsma. The Jubilee from Leviticus to Qumran. Brill, 2006. .
Calum Carmichael. Illuminating Leviticus: A Study of Its Laws and Institutions in the Light of Biblical Narratives. Baltimore: Johns Hopkins University Press, 2006. .
Suzanne A. Brody. "Lost Jubilee." In Dancing in the White Spaces: The Yearly Torah Cycle and More Poems, page 92. Shelbyville, Kentucky: Wasteland Press, 2007. .
Shai Cherry. "The Hebrew Slave." In Torah Through Time: Understanding Bible Commentary, from the Rabbinic Period to Modern Times, pages 101–31. Philadelphia: The Jewish Publication Society, 2007. .

James L. Kugel. How To Read the Bible: A Guide to Scripture, Then and Now, pages 150, 291, 302, 345, 609–10, 683. New York: Free Press, 2007. .
Christophe Nihan. From Priestly Torah to Pentateuch: A Study in the Composition of the Book of Leviticus. Coronet Books, 2007. .
Yosef Zvi Rimon. Shemita: From the Sources to Practical Halacha. The Toby Press, 2008. .
The Torah: A Women's Commentary. Edited by Tamara Cohn Eskenazi and Andrea L. Weiss, pages 747–64. New York: URJ Press, 2008. .
Bruce Feiler. “Proclaim Liberty Throughout the Land.” In America's Prophet: Moses and the American Story, pages 35–72. New York: William Morrow, 2009. .
Roy E. Gane. "Leviticus." In Zondervan Illustrated Bible Backgrounds Commentary. Edited by John H. Walton, volume 1, pages 322–23. Grand Rapids, Michigan: Zondervan, 2009. .
Reuven Hammer. Entering Torah: Prefaces to the Weekly Torah Portion, pages 185–87. New York: Gefen Publishing House, 2009. .
Alicia Jo Rabins. "Snow/Scorpions and Spiders." In Girls in Trouble. New York: JDub Music, 2009. (Miriam's perspective on her banishment).
Jacob J. Staub. “Neither Oppress nor Allow Others to Oppress You: Parashat Behar (Leviticus 25:1–26:2).” In Torah Queeries: Weekly Commentaries on the Hebrew Bible. Edited by Gregg Drinkwater, Joshua Lesser, and David Shneer; foreword by Judith Plaskow, pages 174–78. New York: New York University Press, 2009. .
Stuart Lasine. “Everything Belongs to Me: Holiness, Danger, and Divine Kingship in the Post-Genesis World.” Journal for the Study of the Old Testament, volume 35 (number 1) (September 2010): pages 31–62.
Jerry Z. Muller. "The Long Shadow of Usury." In Capitalism and the Jews, pages 15–71. Princeton: Princeton University Press, 2010. .
Eric Nelson. "‘For the Land Is Mine': The Hebrew Commonwealth and the Rise of Redistribution." In The Hebrew Republic: Jewish Sources and the Transformation of European Political Thought, pages 57–87. Cambridge, Massachusetts: Harvard University Press, 2010. .
Jeffrey Stackert. "Leviticus." In The New Oxford Annotated Bible: New Revised Standard Version with the Apocrypha: An Ecumenical Study Bible. Edited by Michael D. Coogan, Marc Z. Brettler, Carol A. Newsom, and Pheme Perkins, pages 178–80. New York: Oxford University Press, Revised 4th Edition 2010. .
Joseph Telushkin. Hillel: If Not Now, When? pages 52–54. New York: Nextbook, Schocken, 2010. . (sale of a house in a walled city).
David Graeber. Debt: The First 5000 Years. Brooklyn: Melville House, 2011. . (Jubilee).
Sun-Jong Kim. “The Group Identity of the Human Beneficiaries in the Sabbatical Year (Lev 25:6).” Vetus Testamentum, volume 61 (number 1) (2011): pages 71–81.
William G. Dever. The Lives of Ordinary People in Ancient Israel: When Archaeology and the Bible Intersect, pages 133–34, 290. Grand Rapids, Michigan: William B. Eerdmans Publishing Company, 2012. .

Shmuel Herzfeld. "Are Jews Free Today." In Fifty-Four Pick Up: Fifteen-Minute Inspirational Torah Lessons, pages 179–83. Jerusalem: Gefen Publishing House, 2012. .
Stephen Beard. "Britain Wants To Be Hub for Sharia Banking." Marketplace. (July 18, 2013) (adaptation to Islam's parallel prohibition on charging interest).
Nicholas Kristof. "When Emily Was Sold for Sex." The New York Times. (February 13, 2014): page A27. (human trafficking in our time).
Ellen Frankel. "Taking Stock: How can we restore a balance to our lives and to the earth?" The Jerusalem Report, volume 25 (number 3) (May 19, 2014): page 47.
Walk Free Foundation. The Global Slavery Index 2014. Australia, 2014.
Joanna Paraszczuk. "Modernizing the Agricultural Sabbath: Science is called in to cope with the requirements of shmita." The Jerusalem Report, volume 25 (number 15) (November 3, 2014): pages 30–33.

Pablo Diego-Rosell and Jacqueline Joudo Larsen. "35.8 Million Adults and Children in Slavery Worldwide." Gallup. (November 17, 2014).
Jonathan Sacks. Covenant & Conversation: A Weekly Reading of the Jewish Bible: Leviticus: The Book of Holiness, pages 359–400. Jerusalem: Maggid Books, 2015. .
Jonathan Sacks. Lessons in Leadership: A Weekly Reading of the Jewish Bible, pages 169–73. New Milford, Connecticut: Maggid Books, 2015. .
Jonathan Sacks. Essays on Ethics: A Weekly Reading of the Jewish Bible, pages 201–05. New Milford, Connecticut: Maggid Books, 2016. .
Mary Green Swig, Steven L. Swig, and Roger Hickey. "For the Student Debt Movement, JUBILEE is an Old Idea Made New." Campaign for America's Future. February 3, 2016.
 
Kim Stanley Robinson. New York 2140. New York: Orbit, 2017. . (Jubilee plot element).
U.S. Department of State. Trafficking in Persons Report: June 2017. (slavery in the present day).
Shai Held. The Heart of Torah, Volume 2: Essays on the Weekly Torah Portion: Leviticus, Numbers, and Deuteronomy, pages 76–85. Philadelphia: Jewish Publication Society, 2017. .
Steven Levy and Sarah Levy. The JPS Rashi Discussion Torah Commentary, pages 103–05. Philadelphia: Jewish Publication Society, 2017. .
Pekka Pitkänen. “Ancient Israelite Population Economy: Ger, Toshav, Nakhri and Karat as Settler Colonial Categories.” Journal for the Study of the Old Testament, volume 42 (number 2) (December 2017): pages 139–53.
U.S. Department of State. Trafficking in Persons Report: June 2019. (slavery in the present day).

External links

Texts
Masoretic text and 1917 JPS translation
Hear the parashah chanted 
Hear the parashah read in Hebrew

Commentaries

Academy for Jewish Religion, California
Academy for Jewish Religion, New York
Aish.com 
Akhlah: The Jewish Children's Learning Network 
Aleph Beta Academy
American Jewish University — Ziegler School of Rabbinic Studies
Anshe Emes Synagogue, Los Angeles 
Ari Goldwag
Ascent of Safed
Bar-Ilan University
Chabad.org
eparsha.com
G-dcast
The Israel Koschitzky Virtual Beit Midrash
Jewish Agency for Israel
Jewish Theological Seminary
Kabbala Online 
LearningTorah.org
Mechon Hadar
Miriam Aflalo
MyJewishLearning.com
Ohr Sameach
Orthodox Union
OzTorah, Torah from Australia
Oz Ve Shalom — Netivot Shalom
Pardes from Jerusalem
Professor James L. Kugel
Professor Michael Carasik
Rabbi Dov Linzer
Rabbi Fabian Werbin
Rabbi Jonathan Sacks
RabbiShimon.com 
Rabbi Shlomo Riskin
Rabbi Shmuel Herzfeld
Rabbi Stan Levin
Reconstructionist Judaism 
Sephardic Institute
Shiur.com
613.org Jewish Torah Audio
Tanach Study Center
Teach613.org, Torah Education at Cherry Hill
TheTorah.com
Torah Downloads
Torah from Dixie 
Torah.org
TorahVort
Union for Reform Judaism
United Synagogue of Conservative Judaism
What's Bothering Rashi?
Yeshivat Chovevei Torah
Yeshiva University

Weekly Torah readings in Iyar
Weekly Torah readings from Leviticus